= Friedhof Trenkebergstraße =

Cemetery in Cologne, Germany

Coordinates: 50°51′29″N 6°55′51″E

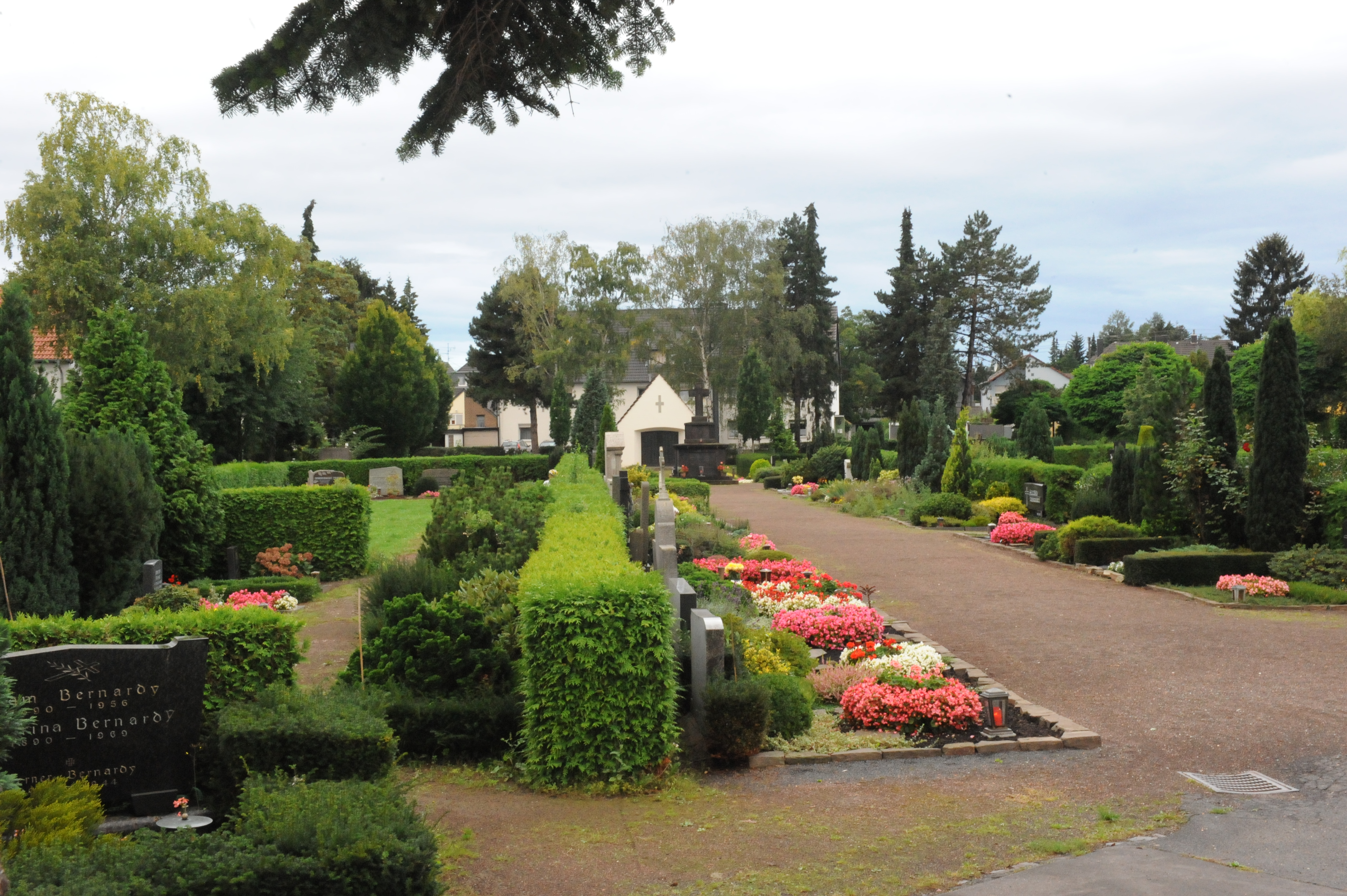

Friedhof Trenkebergstraße is a cemetery in Cologne, Germany. The cemetery is 4,600 m^{2} and offers space for 790 graves. Furthermore, there are 16 graves in this cemetery for German victims of the Second World War.
